Lepidophyma zongolica is a species of lizard in the family Xantusiidae. It is a small lizard found in Mexico.

References

Lepidophyma
Endemic reptiles of Mexico
Reptiles described in 2010